This is the complete list of Asian Winter Games medalists in biathlon from 1986 to 2017.

Men

10 km sprint

12.5 km pursuit

15 km mass start

20 km individual

4 × 7.5 km relay

Women

7.5 km sprint

10 km pursuit

12.5 km mass start

15 km individual

4 × 6 km relay
 4 × 7.5 km relay: 1996–1999

Mixed

2 × 6 km + 2 × 7.5 km relay

References

External links
 1990 Results
 1996 Results

Biathlon
medalists